The Olympic Sliding Centre (올림픽 슬라이딩 센터) is a bobsleigh, luge, and skeleton track that is located in Daegwallyeong, Pyeongchang, South Korea.  The centre is located between the Alpensia and Yongpyong Resort. The venue is one of only two operating sliding facilities in Asia, along with the Spiral in Japan.

It was renamed from Alpensia Sliding Centre to Olympic Sliding Centre in June 2017.

Championships hosted 
 2016-2017 Luge, Skeleton, and Bobsleigh World Cups
 2018 Olympic Luge, Skeleton, and Bobsleigh

Track technical details

Construction
The venue was built by Daelim under the responsibility of the Gangwon Province. The construction cost  (about ), to be shared between the country and the regional authorities: National Government , Local Government .

The construction of the Alpensia Sliding Centre started in March 2014 and was completed in the final months of 2017.

Characteristics 
The venue can also hold 7,000 attendants, with 1,000 seats and standing room for the remaining 6,000.

2018 Winter Olympics
During coverage of the Games on NBC Sports in the United States, the track was referred to as "The House of Speed" while turns 9-12 were referred to as "Run Breaker" for the fact they slowed down the sleds so much that it costs sliders positions, including medals. The best known example was Germany's Felix Loch who was leading after three runs in the luge men's singles event only to have problems during the final run through "Run Breaker", causing the two-time defending Olympic champion to finish 5th.

Turn 2 was named 'Soju' by sliders, after the local Korean liquor, because "it messes you up."

During the Games, the Turn 9-10-11 sequence was christened the name "The Dragon's Tail". Tweak the Dragon's Tail and you'll pay the price. Other Dragon-based names appeared in the Downhill and Slalom courses, reflecting the importance of the Dragon in Korean mythology.

Turn 14 was named The Olympic Curve - inspired by the PyeongChang 2018 logo, set in the ice.

Track Records

References

Venues of the 2018 Winter Olympics
Bobsleigh, luge, and skeleton tracks
Olympic bobsleigh venues
Olympic luge venues
Olympic skeleton venues
Sports venues in Pyeongchang County
2017 establishments in South Korea
Sports venues completed in 2017